Yeşim Arat (born September 5, 1955), is a Turkish political scientist and author specialized in gender politics, Turkish politics, women in Turkish politics, and women's movements in Turkey. She is a professor in the department of political science and international relations at Boğaziçi University.

Early life and education 
Yeşim Arat was born on September 5, 1995. She completed a B.A. in political science and economics at Yale University in 1978. Arat earned a M.A. (1980) and Ph.D. (1983) in the department of politics at Princeton University. Her dissertation was titled, Women in Turkish Politics. Arat's doctoral advisor was John Waterbury.

Career 
Arat joined the faculty at Boğaziçi University in 1983 as an assistant professor in the department of political science and international relations. She was promoted to associate professor in 1990 and professor in May 1996. Arat served as the vice rector for academic affairs (provost) from August 2008 to August 2012. She was chair of the department January 1997 to January 1999, April 2013 to September 2014, and September 2015 to July 2017.

She researches gender politics, Turkish politics, women in Turkish politics, and women's movements in Turkey.

Awards and honors 
Arat was elected member of The Science Academy Society of Turkey in 2012.

Selected works

Books

References

External links 

 

1955 births
Living people
Place of birth missing (living people)
Turkish political scientists
Turkish women scientists
Women political scientists
Women's studies academics
Turkish women academics
Academic staff of Boğaziçi University
20th-century Turkish women writers
20th-century Turkish writers
21st-century Turkish women writers
Turkish non-fiction writers